You're Still Here may refer to:
 You're Still Here (song), a 2003 song by Faith Hill
 You're Still Here (Fear the Walking Dead), an episode of the television series Fear the Walking Dead